The Bancroft Prize is awarded each year by the trustees of Columbia University for books about diplomacy or the history of the Americas.

It was established in 1948, with a bequest from Frederic Bancroft, in his memory and that of his brother, diplomat and attorney, Edgar Addison Bancroft.

The Bancroft Prize is considered one of the most distinguished academic awards in the field of history. The prize has been generally considered to be among the most prestigious awards in the field of American history writing. It comes with a $10,000 stipend (raised from $4,000 beginning in 2004). Seventeen winners had their work supported by the National Endowment for the Humanities, and 16 winners were also recipients of the Pulitzer Prize for History.

The prize was affected by the post-award controversy involving the scholarship of Michael A. Bellesiles, who received the prize for his work in 2001. Following independent investigations, Columbia University rescinded the prize for the first and only time.

Winners of the Bancroft Prize

See also
 List of history awards
 List of American literary awards
 List of literary awards

References

 
 
American history awards
Awards established in 1948
American non-fiction literary awards
Columbia University Libraries
Awards and prizes of Columbia University
1948 establishments in New York City